9 is Do As Infinity's first video clip collection.

Video track listing
 "Tangerine Dream"
 "Heart"
 "Oasis"
 "Yesterday & Today"
 "Raven"
 "Welcome!"
 "Rumble Fish"
 "We Are."
 "Desire"

References

External links
 9 at Avex Network

Do As Infinity video albums
2001 video albums
Music video compilation albums
2001 compilation albums